Kushibiki is a Japanese surname. Notable people with the surname include:

, Japanese footballer
, Japanese footballer
, Japanese footballer
, Japanese impresario

See also
Kushibiki, Yamagata, a former town in Higashitagawa District, Yamagata Prefecture, Japan

Japanese-language surnames